Brian L. Ott is professor of Communication Studies and Director of the Texas Tech University Press (TTUP) at Texas Tech University. He is an author and communications expert in the field of study of rhetoric and media.

Ott earned his bachelor's degree from George Mason University, a master's degree and PhD from The Pennsylvania State University. He is a contributor for Newsweek, Salon, The Hill, USA Today and other publications.

Selected publications
 The Twitter presidency: Donald J. Trump and the politics of White Rage with Greg Dickinson. Routledge, New York, 2019. 
 Critical Media Studies: An Introduction with Robert Mack. Wiley-Blackwell, Malden, 2014. 
 The Routledge Reader in Rhetorical Criticism with Greg Dickinson. Routledge, New York, 2013. 
 Places of public memory: The rhetoric of museums and memorials with Carole Blair and Greg Dickinson. University of Alabama Press, Tuscaloosa, 2010. 
 It's Not Tv: Watching HBO in the Post-Television Era with Cara Louise Buckley and Mark Leverette. Routledge, New York, 2010. 
 The small screen: How television equips us to live in the Information Age. Wiley-Blackwell, Malden, 2007.

References

George Mason University alumni
Living people
Texas Tech University faculty
Pennsylvania State University alumni
Place of birth missing (living people)
Year of birth missing (living people)